The military ranks of People's Republic of Kampuchea are the military insignia used by the Kampuchean People's Revolutionary Armed Forces.

Commissioned officer ranks
The rank insignia of commissioned officers.

Other ranks
The rank insignia of non-commissioned officers and enlisted personnel.

References

External links
 

Military ranks of Cambodia